RNA, 18S ribosomal is a protein that in humans is encoded by the LOC109910383 gene.

References